Philipp Daniel Merckle (born 1 October 1966 in Hamburg, Germany) is a German entrepreneur.  From 2005 to 2008 he has headed the pharmaceutical company Ratiopharm within the family group Merckle.

Early life 
After he graduated from high school, Merckle began business training, eventually earning a Bachelor of Arts degree as Betriebswirt. In 1998 he earned PhD in pharmaceutical studies at the University of Tübingen.

Career 
In 1999, he took over the research and development of pharmaceutical company Merckle / Ratiopharm.

Public Appearances
As Ratiopharm chief Philip Merckle was featured in TV advertising with Karlheinz Böhm.  At the Africa Foundation, he manages the company's policy of selling pills to African refugees for 1 cent each.
In May 2007, he joined under one of his company initiated "Awakening Tour" together with Arved Fuchs and Mark Ehrenfried , during which he opined about economic policies he would like to see instituted in Europe.

References 

1966 births
Living people
Businesspeople from Hamburg
University of Tübingen alumni